Važec ( or ;  or ) is a village and municipality in Liptovský Mikuláš District in the Žilina Region of northern Slovakia, at the foot of Kriváň in the High Tatras mountains, Slovakia's symbolic and often considered most beautiful mountain.

History
In historical records the village was first mentioned in 1280. Jaroslav Augusta painted a number of watercolors of this village.

Fire of 1931
464 of the village's 582 homes were destroyed by fire July 17–18, 1931. The fire killed 6 persons and injured 18 others, resulted in the loss of hundreds of heads of stock, and produced damages estimated at $1 million in 1931 dollars. The fire originated from three different points, raising suspicion of incendiarism.

Geography
The municipality lies at an altitude of 792 metres and covers an area of 59.685 km2. It has a population of about 2,400 people.

References

Villages and municipalities in Liptovský Mikuláš District